The National Swedish School of Acting may refer to:

National Swedish School of Acting, Gothenburg
National Swedish School of Acting, Malmö
National Swedish School of Acting, Stockholm